Pleiospermium is a genus of plant in family Rutaceae.

Species
, Plants of the World Online accepted the following species:
Pleiospermium alatum (Wall. ex Wight & Arn.) Swingle
Pleiospermium annamense Guillaumin
Pleiospermium dubium (Blume) Swingle
Pleiospermium latialatum Swingle
Pleiospermium littorale (Miq.) Tanaka – treated as Limnocitrus littoralis in a 2021 classification of the family Rutaceae
Pleiospermium longisepalum Swingle
Pleiospermium sumatranum Swingle

References

External links

 
Aurantioideae genera
Taxonomy articles created by Polbot